Libya (Socialist People's Libyan Arab Jamahiriya) competed at the 1980 Summer Olympics in Moscow, USSR. The nation returned to the Olympic Games after boycotting the 1976 Summer Olympics. 29 competitors, 27 men and 2 women, took part in 20 events in 5 sports.

Athletics

Men's 200 metres
 Ahmed Sallouma
 Heat — 22.88 (→ did not advance)

Men's 800 metres
 Salem El-Margini 
 Heat — 1:50.0 (→ did not advance)

Men's 1,500 metres
Marzouk Mabrouk
 Heat — 3:54.3 (→ did not advance)

Men's Marathon
 Esa Shetewi
 Final — 2:38:01 (→ 44th place)

 Enemri el-Marghani
 Final — 2:42:27 (→ 49th place)

Men's 4x400 metres Relay
 Abashir Fellah, Salem el-Margini, Ahmed Seluma, and Elmehdi Diab
 Heat — 3:16.7 (→ did not advance)

Cycling

Seven cyclists represented Libya in 1980.

Individual road race
 El-Munsif Ben Youssef
 Ali Hamid El-Aila
 Mohamed Ganfud
 Nuri Kaheil

Team time trial
 Ali Hamid El-Aila
 Mohamed El-Kamaa
 Nuri Kaheil
 Khalid Shebani

Sprint
 Fawzi Abdussalam

1000m time trial
 Khalid Shebani

Swimming

Men's 100m Freestyle
 Abdulwahab Werfeli
 Heats — 1.01,55 (→ did not advance, 36th place)
Women's 100m Butterfly
 Nadia Fezzani
Women's 200m Freestyle
 Soad Fezzani
Women's 400m Freestyle
 Soad Fezzani
Women's 100m backstroke
 Soad Fezzani

Volleyball

Men's team competition
 Preliminary Round (Group B)
 Lost to Romania (0-3)
 Lost to Poland (0-3)
 Lost to Brazil (0-3)
 Lost to Yugoslavia (0-3)
 Classification Match
 9th/10th place: Lost to Italy (0-3) → 10th place

Team Roster
 Kamaluddin Badi
 Adnan el-Khuja
 Samir Sagar
 Miloud Zakka
 Mohamed Bochor
 Ahmed Zoubi
 Awad Zakka
 Ahmed el-Fagei
 Jamal Zarugh
 Elmendi el-Sherif
 Ragab Zakka Wanis
 Mustafa el-Musbah

Weightlifting
Men's Flyweight
 Almabruk Mahmud Mahmud (→ 15th place)
Men's Bantamweight
 Ali Shalabi (→ 17th place)

References

External links
Official Olympic Reports

Nations at the 1980 Summer Olympics
1980
Olympics